Kunming City Museum is a history museum in Kunming City, Yunnan, China. Smaller than the Yunnan Provincial Museum, Its most notable exhibit is about the history of the city. Other features include a dinosaur exhibit and a rotating exhibition space that holds anything from history to art exhibitions. 

There is also a scale model of the Kunming area documenting archeological sites relating to the illiterate Dian culture that dominated the area sometime around 400 BC – 100 AD.

See also
 List of museums in China

References 
 http://www.acrosschina.org/summercamp.php?action=program

External links

 Official website

Museums in Kunming
Local museums in China